Tuckahoe station is a commuter rail stop on the Metro-North Railroad's Harlem Line, located in the village of Tuckahoe, New York.

History
The New York and Harlem Railroad laid tracks through Tuckahoe during the mid-1840s, and evidence of a station in Tuckahoe can be found at least as far back as the 1850s. The current Tuckahoe station building was originally built in 1901, by the New York Central Railroad,  and was given an additional baggage elevator approximately in 1912. The station continued to serve commuters without much change until the New York Central merged with rival Pennsylvania Railroad to form Penn Central in 1968. As Penn Central was facing bankruptcy, the Metropolitan Transportation Authority began subsidizing service in 1970, and high-level platforms were constructed to accommodate the new M1A electric MU cars being delivered at the time. Operation of the railroad continued and was passed on to Conrail in 1976. Metro-North took over direct operation in 1983.

In the Spring of 1989, the platforms were reconstructed, along with those of Fleetwood, Bronxville, and Crestwood stations. The baggage and freight elevators were also converted into passenger elevators. Along with Hartsdale and Scarsdale, it is one of three stations on the Harlem Line that features a Starbucks coffee shop inside its station building, a location which opened in June 2006.

Station layout
The station has two high-level side platforms, each 12 cars long.

As of August 2006, daily commuter ridership was 1,378 and there are 314 parking spots.

References

External links

 Tuckahoe Station and vicinity during the April 16, 2007 Nor'easter (Flickr)
 Tuckahoe Metro-North Station (TheSubwayNut)
 Station House from Google Maps Street View

Tuckahoe, Westchester County, New York
Metro-North Railroad stations in New York (state)
Former New York Central Railroad stations
Railway stations in Westchester County, New York
Railway stations in the United States opened in 1844
1844 establishments in New York (state)
Transportation in Westchester County, New York